Isaac's Universe is a fictional universe created by Isaac Asimov for other science fiction writers to use as a setting.  It introduces the collaborative science fiction universe created by Asimov which eventually resulted in five volumes: three short story collections and two novels. It was initiated by Martin H. Greenberg, who also edited and published its three short stories collection by Avon Books starting in 1990.

Volume One: The Diplomacy Guild is 258 pages long, not counting an additional couple of pages in back on the authors contributing their works.   There is also an introduction by Asimov that is seven pages long. This was followed by Volume Two: Phases in Chaos and Volume Three: Unnatural Diplomacy. The novels are: Fossil by Hal Clement and Murder at the Galactic Writers' Society by Janet Asimov.

The premise of Isaac's Universe is that the Milky Way Galaxy in the future is populated by six high-tech, space-faring species, a response by Asimov "to criticisms that he had rarely dealt with aliens":

 Erthumoi: Human beings, who have colonized many planets beyond Earth and have extended their lifespans with rejuvenation treatments. 
 Cephallonians: An aquatic species who live in water-filled spaceships, described by Asimov as vaguely analogous to porpoises. 
 Locrians: A skeletal, insect-like species, adapted to a low-oxygen atmosphere with neon rather than nitrogen.
 Naxians: Limbless, snake-like beings, able to read the emotional state of individuals from any organic species just by observing them. 
 Crotonites: A small winged species who live in an atmosphere poisonous to the other species, and who consider the other species inferior and look on them with contempt. 
 Samians: Physically powerful, slow-moving, block-like creatures with no appendages who live on a high gravity planet.

Robert Silverberg, who wrote the first Isaac's Universe story, added the idea that there is a seventh, mysterious race which has never been seen, but which has left behind artifacts spread throughout the galaxy.

For Love and Glory

Poul Anderson's last novel, For Love and Glory, incorporates "The Burning Sky" from The Diplomacy Guild and "Woodcraft" from Phases in Chaos. In the acknowledgements, Anderson explains that the original stories were altered substantially for publication in this edition, including changes to names, characters and setting so as not to conflict with the original anthologies or inhibit authors who may use the setting in future. The plotline involves the discovery of an artifact crafted by a mysterious Forerunner race.

List of Books

Anthologies
 The Diplomacy Guild by Martin H. Greenberg (1990) includes: Robert Silverberg's "They Seek, We Hide" (55 pages), David Brin's "The Diplomacy Guild" (21 pages), Robert Sheckley's "Myryx" (60 pages), Poul Anderson's "The Burning Sky" (83 pages) and Harry Turtledove's "Island of the Gods" (37 pages).
 Phases in Chaos by Martin H. Greenberg (1991) includes: Allen Steele's "Mecca", Harry Turtledove's "Thirty Pieces", Hal Clement's "Phases in Chaos", Karen Haber's "The Soul of Truth", Lawrence Watt-Evans's "Keep the Faith", Janet Kagan's "Winging It", George Alec Effinger's "The Reinvention of War" and Poul Anderson's "Woodcraft".
 Unnatural Diplomacy by Martin H. Greenberg (1992) includes: Harry Turtledove's "Breakups", Lawrence Watt-Evans's "One Man's Meat", Janet Kagan's "Fighting Words", George Alec Effinger's "Water of Life", Hal Clement's "Eyeball Vectors", Rebecca Ore's "Liquid Assets" and Karen Haber's "Unnatural Diplomacy".

Novels
 Fossil by Hal Clement (1993)
 Murder at the Galactic Writers' Society by Janet Asimov (1995)

Reception
Science fiction scholar Gary Westfahl defined Isaac's Universe as a shared universe in the narrow sense of a "deliberate creation of a hitherto-unknown setting for writers to employ in original stories". In his estimation, Isaac's Universe is distinguished by "the unusual quality of writers" who contributed to it, a testament of Asimov's unique status in the genre.

Speculative fiction researcher Anne Besson counted the open creation of Isaac's Universe as an instance where Asimov has put his notoriety to the service in the genre. While Besson considered the project overall a mixed success, she, like Westfahl, saw this as a good example of a cycle of fiction which is deliberately set up to go beyond one author. The experienced Asimov provided a fixed framework, and other and younger writers could work with this common universe, so that it ends up seeming limitless.

Patricia Monk saw Isaac's Universe as "a new megatext" created by Asimov for new writers to expand, following the opening up of the Robot series to other authors. Monk pointed out the discrepancy between the design of Isaac's Universe as an invitation to beginners in the field, and the actual participation by distinguished writers.

References

Science fiction anthology series
Shared universes
Isaac Asimov